Vladislav Aleksandrovich Tretiak, MSM (born 25 April 1952) is a Russian former goaltender for the Soviet Union national ice hockey team. Considered to be one of the greatest goaltenders in the history of the sport, he was voted one of six players to the International Ice Hockey Federation's (IIHF) Centennial All-Star Team in a poll conducted by a group of 56 experts from 16 countries. He is the current president of the Ice Hockey Federation of Russia and was the general manager of the Russian 2010 Winter Olympic team.

Early years 
Tretiak grew up in the USSR. His parents are from Dmitrovsky District. His father served 37 years as a military pilot, and his mother was a physical education teacher. Although he initially followed his brother as a swimmer, as a child Tretiak excelled at many sports, and is remembered for his ambition to master all of them. However, like many children of his generation, he loved hockey, and at age 11 entered the Children and Youth Sports School of the Central Sports Club of the Army (known by its abbreviation CSKA). His first trainer was Vitaly Erfilov. He began playing goaltender when he saw that no one else had the desire or courage to play the position.

International playing career 
Although Tretiak did not play his first hockey game until the age of eleven (1963), he was well known in the USSR by 1971 (aged 19), when he was named to the Soviet Ice Hockey League's First All-Star Team, while playing for the powerhouse Red Army team, CSKA Moscow.  He also played well in the 1972 Winter Olympics, in which the Soviets took the gold medal.

Tretiak became internationally famous after his outstanding performance in the Summit Series in 1972, when he helped surprise the world, including the Canadian team, en route to a narrow loss to the Canadians.  A famous story was told of how Canadian scouts seriously underestimated his ability prior to the series; they witnessed him let in eight goals on a particular night, not knowing that he had been married the previous evening (and most of the team had been in attendance). Of the entire Soviet roster, Canadian players and fans held Tretiak in the highest regard and respect and Tretiak was one of the most famous players of the Series along with Phil Esposito, Paul Henderson, Alexandr Iakushev and Valeri Kharlamov. As a result of Tretiak's stellar performance, many NHL teams wanted to draft him – Montreal ultimately did, in 1983 – and Tretiak was willing, but the Soviet government did not let him leave.

During the 1976 Super Series, Tretiak put on a dominant performance against the Montreal Canadiens, holding them to a 3–3 tie despite his team being outshot 38–13.

Tretiak went on to star for the Soviet Union, helping them win gold medals in the 1976 Winter Olympics, and again winning gold in the 1984 Winter Olympics and the 1981 Canada Cup.  Tretiak also back-stopped the Soviets to ten IIHF World Championships victories and nine in the IIHF European Championships.

In the 1980 Winter Olympics, a USSR team loss to team USA in a medal round game denied Tretiak a chance at another gold. The Soviet team won silver, as they had the second-highest number of points in the tournament..

Though he was only 32 in 1984 and still capable of playing top-level hockey, Tretiak retired. It is said that he wanted to spend more time with his family and asked the national team coach Viktor Tikhonov for a training regime, in which he could live at home and come to the training camp before games. Since the rest of the team spent most of their time away from home in the training camp, Tikhonov refused. This move by Tikhonov contributed to Tretiak's decision to retire.

Post retirement 
Tretiak was one of the guests who spoke at the ceremony during which the Montreal Canadiens retired the jersey number of Ken Dryden on 29 January 2007. Dryden had been one of Team Canada's goaltenders during the 1972 Summit Series, opposite Tretiak.

Tretiak retired in 1984, following a 2–0 victory over Czechoslovakia. He was awarded Order of the Red Banner of Labour (1984). In 1987 Tretiak wrote an autobiography, Tretiak, The Legend. He was named to the Hockey Hall of Fame in 1989, the first Soviet player to be honored.

In 1990, Mike Keenan hired Tretiak as a goaltender coach for the Chicago Blackhawks, which allowed him to coach goaltenders such as Ed Belfour, Dominik Hašek, and Jocelyn Thibault. Keenan was so impressed with Tretiak's abilities in practice that he suggested the 38-year-old might still be able to play in the NHL. Tretiak said that coaching was the next best thing to playing in the NHL. After leaving the Blackhawks, Belfour wore uniform number 20 as a tribute to Tretiak. Numerous other goalies, including Evgeni Nabokov, also wore number 20 as a tribute to Tretiak.

In 2000, he was voted Best Russian Hockey Player of the 20th century. He was a vital cog for some of the most dominant hockey teams in history and is now considered one of hockey's greatest ambassadors.

Tretiak was elected to the State Duma as a member of the United Russia party in December 2003, representing the Saratov constituency.  He is chairman of the State Duma Committee on Physical Culture, Sport, and Youth.

He continued to work for the Chicago Blackhawks until the start of 2006–07 season. On 25 April 2006, his 54th birthday, Tretiak was elected head of the Russian Ice Hockey Federation. He obtained 93 out of the possible 96 votes, with the remaining three voters abstaining. A few days later, on 28 April, the Governor General of Canada awarded Tretiak the Meritorious Service Medal in a ceremony at Rideau Hall.  Tretiak earned the award for, among other things, his founding of the Friends of Canada organization to foster good relations between Canada and Russia. He was the first Russian to be conferred this honor.

He also ran a goalie school at the Canlan Ice Sports in Toronto, Ontario. Called the Vladislav Tretiak Elite School of Goaltending, it was considered one of the most physically punishing goaltending schools in the world, and students could be refused admittance if not in top physical condition. He also ran a goalie school in Montreal during the 1990's where he trained many famous NHL goaltenders such as Jose Theodore and Martin Brodeur. Tretiak also ran a goalie hockey camp in Detroit Lakes, Minnesota in the early 2000s.

On 28 March 2007, Tretiak went to Ottawa to discuss with Canadian officials the possibilities of holding another Summit Series during the summer of 2007, which would be 35 years after the initial event. Russian Prime Minister Mikhail Fradkov had also discussed with Canadian Prime Minister Stephen Harper about the possibilities of holding another event.  In the end, a series was held in September 2007 between the national junior teams of Canada and Russia.

On 21 December 2012, he voted in favor of the "Dima Yakovlev Law" in the State Duma. This legislation bars the adoption of Russian children by U.S. citizens. The legislation was the response to the Magnitsky bill, whose purpose was punishing Russian officials responsible for the death of Russian tax lawyer Sergei Magnitsky in a Moscow prison in 2009 and also to grant permanent normal trade relations status to Russia.

Tretiak was the final torchbearer in the 2014 Winter Olympics in Sochi, Russia and lit the Olympic Flame during the opening ceremony along with Irina Rodnina.

Personal
Tretiak married his wife Tatiana (born 1950) on August 23, 1972, six weeks after they met. Their first son, Dmitri, was born the following year and their daughter, Irina, was born 3 years later. Tatiana is qualified as a Russian literature teacher, although she no longer works. Tretiak is a devout Russian Orthodox Christian.

Career statistics

Soviet League

International statistics

Super Series statistics 
The Super Series were exhibition games between an NHL team and Soviet teams (usually a club from the Soviet Championship League). Tretiak competed in three such series.

Records and honours 
 First All-Star in the Soviet League consecutively each year from 1971 until 1984.  In those fourteen years, Tretiak won thirteen league titles with CSKA Moscow, and was named MVP of the league five times
 In 1978, Tretiak was awarded the Order of Lenin
 First player born and trained outside North America to be inducted into the Hockey Hall of Fame
 Order For Merit to the Fatherland 3rd (2012) and 4th (2002) class (Russian Federation)
 Order of Honour (Russian Federation)
 Order of the Red Banner of Labour (USSR)
 Order of Friendship of Peoples (USSR)
 Order of the Badge of Honour (USSR)
 Medal "For Labour Valour" (USSR)
 Jubilee Medal "60 Years of the Armed Forces of the USSR" (USSR)
 In the 2014 Winter Olympics in Sochi, Russia, he was given the honor of being the lighter of the Olympic Cauldron along with Irina Rodnina.
 Meritorious Service Medal (Canada)

Support for other sports
Tretiak has supported the bid for bandy to be recognized as an Olympic sport.

References

External links 

 
 Vladislav Tretiak at Hockey CCCP International
 Tretiak's biography and statistics at 1972summitseries.com
 
 

1952 births
Living people
21st-century Russian politicians
Chicago Blackhawks coaches
Eighth convocation members of the State Duma (Russian Federation)
Fifth convocation members of the State Duma (Russian Federation)
Fourth convocation members of the State Duma (Russian Federation)
HC CSKA Moscow players
Hockey Hall of Fame inductees
Hockey writers
Honoured Masters of Sport of the USSR
Ice hockey players at the 1972 Winter Olympics
Ice hockey players at the 1976 Winter Olympics
Ice hockey players at the 1980 Winter Olympics
Ice hockey players at the 1984 Winter Olympics
IIHF Hall of Fame inductees
Medalists at the 1972 Winter Olympics
Medalists at the 1976 Winter Olympics
Medalists at the 1980 Winter Olympics
Medalists at the 1984 Winter Olympics
Montreal Canadiens draft picks
National Hockey League assistant coaches
Olympic cauldron lighters
Olympic gold medalists for the Soviet Union
Olympic ice hockey players of the Soviet Union
Olympic medalists in ice hockey
Olympic silver medalists for the Soviet Union
People from Dmitrovsky District, Moscow Oblast
Recipients of the Meritorious Service Decoration
Recipients of the Order of Lenin
Recipients of the Order "For Merit to the Fatherland", 3rd class
Russia men's national ice hockey team coaches
Russian ice hockey administrators
Russian sportsperson-politicians
Russian Orthodox Christians from Russia
Seventh convocation members of the State Duma (Russian Federation)
Sixth convocation members of the State Duma (Russian Federation)
Soviet ice hockey goaltenders
Russian ice hockey goaltenders
United Russia politicians